Mano Po 4: Ako Legal Wife is a 2005 Filipino comedy-drama film produced by Regal Entertainment, and an entry to the 2005 Metro Manila Film Festival. The film focuses on the lives of the Chinese-Filipino community, but rather in a comedic way unlike in the first three Mano Po installments which are used in a melodramatic way. It stars Jay Manalo, Zsa Zsa Padilla as Chona the Legal Wife, Cherry Pie Picache as Patty the Lucky Wife and Rufa Mae Quinto as Gloria the Latest Wife. The title is considered as the fourth installment of the Mano Po film series and was based on the line of Zsa Zsa Padilla in Mano Po 2: My Home; “Ako legal wife!” (lit. “I am [the] legal wife!”).

Apart from the other Mano Po films, it is the first film in the series to use comedic elements since three of the films in the series centered on perplex drama.

Synopsis
Elton Chiong is a businessman having three wives. Chona, a pure Chinese is his legal wife having three children, Hamilton who is a homosexual, Hibiscus and Anthurium; Patty, who is a Chinese with having a Visayan accent. She gives good luck to Elton, with their only son Nixon; and Gloria, a Filipino is Elton's mistress. The film portrays Chona and Patty's efforts to keep Elton in their arms when they feel threatened at the appearance of Gloria, a more younger and more voluptuous competitor to Elton's heart.

Cast
Jay Manalo as Elton Chiong
Zsa Zsa Padilla as Chona Gao-Chiong
Cherry Pie Picache as Patty Que-Chiong
Rufa Mae Quinto as Gloria Martinez
JC De Vera as Nixon Chiong
John Prats as Hamilton Chiong
Julianne Lee as Hibiscus Chiong
Ella Guevara as Anthurium Chiong
Bianca King as Trixia Sy
Pinky Amador as Elvie Rosales-Tan
Marissa Sanchez as Nancy Dy
Harvey Diez as Benito Co

Awards
At the 2005 Metro Manila Film Festival, Padilla took the award for Best Actress and Picache won the award for Best Supporting Actress.

References

External links

2005 films
2000s Tagalog-language films
2005 comedy-drama films
Philippine comedy-drama films
Regal Entertainment films
2005 comedy films
2005 drama films
Films directed by Joel Lamangan